Panionios Volleyball Club is the volleyball department of the Greek multisport club of Panionios, based in Nea Smirni. It is one of the oldest sport sections of the club with presence since early 20th century. The colours of the club are red and blue and its home arena is the Panionios Indoor Hall.

History
The volleyball department of Panionios was founded in 1913 and was one of the first departments of the club. It was active as long as Panionios was in Smyrna. After the move of Panionios in Greece the volleyball team came to the country. Panionios was the team which imported volleyball in Greece. Until then there wasn't any volley competition in Greece. Panionios starred in the interwar period Athenian championships, regulated by SEGAS. In the post-war period, the section dissolved and was refounded in 1970. 

On 1987 the Women's Volleyball Academy is founded with mini and pangolin teams. Fruits of this effort are the conquest of the Panhellenic Championship of Pagorasides in the period 1993-94 and the corresponding of the Girls in the period 1995-96.

Men's team 
The volleyball department of Panionios is the first in Greece since it was founded in Smyrna in 1913. In 1919 a volleyball championship was held in Smyrna with the participation of eight clubs and the winner was Panionios. It was the first organization of volleyball games by Greek teams. The volleyball players of the club came mainly from the track and the main ones were: Dimitros Karabatis (nail), Panagiotis Retellas, Costas Papazoglou (passer), A. Vassiliadis, Kl. Drivas, Er. Isigonis and later George R.

The club's men's team remained in the lower divisions of the championship until recently. The season 2014-15 Panionios finished in the first place of the local ESPEDA championship and was promoted to A2 for the first time in its history.

Recent seasons

Women's team
Panionios was a pioneer in women's volleyball. From 1926 to 1930 he organized a "Women's Club Volleyball Championship" as well as a juniors championship among the girls 'schools of Athens under the name "Girls' Championship". The women's team of the club was formed in 1926 and participated in the championship of 1927. It consisted of L. Karabatis, A. and K. Nikolopoulou, T. Paschalidou, T. Venieropoulou, V. Karni.

In 1928 the women's team won the Athens championship undefeated. In the qualifying group they defeated A.O. Neanidon, N. Vyronos and American College of Girls P. Faliro and qualified for the semifinals. There they prevailed the G.O. Greek women with 15-9, 15-9. In the final he found A.O. Neanidon again, whom they defeated with 2-1 sets (7-15, 15-4, 15-4).

From this year begins the three-year undefeated course of the women's team of Panionios in the Athens championship, which will end in July 1930 from Paleo Faliro, in the semifinals of the Athens championship, in a match in which the blue and reds left protesting against a decision.

On February 3, 1930, the women's volleyball team of the club went to Chalkida, where it played against S.A. Chalkida, on the occasion of sports games held there. This was probably the first time a women's sports team went to the province because it was invited to a match.

Contrary to the Men's team, the women's team played in first-tier division (A1 Ethniki) for 5 consecutive years, from 2007 to 2012. On 2005 the women's team won the B Ethniki Championship and rose to the A2 Ethniki category. Following, on 2007 the team won the A2 Ethniki Championship and was promoted to A1 Ethniki. On 2012, the team finished 11th and was relegated to A2 Ethniki category. Nowadays the women team plays in Pre League (2nd-tier).

Recent season

Current roster 
2020-2021

Players:

  Ioanna Karelia
  Theodora Boki
  Elena Patrineli
  Nefeli Chatzigrigoriou
  Zoe Georgiou
  Theodora Sarakatsani
  Bianka Guri
  Danai Koudouna
  Lizaveta Chabai
  Elena Baka
  Maria Kanelou
  Natalia Kontopoulou
  Errika Lymperopoulou
  Eva Koumoutsou

Head Coach:
  Dimitris Karagiannis
Assistant Coach:
  Zabetas Fragkoulis

References

External links
Official page

Greek volleyball clubs
Panionios